The Dentist is a 1996 American slasher film directed by Brian Yuzna and written by Dennis Paoli, Stuart Gordon, and Charles Finch. It stars Corbin Bernsen, Linda Hoffman, Earl Boen and Ken Foree. It follows a successful but mentally unstable dentist in Los Angeles who begins committing murder. It is the first installment in The Dentist film series, followed by The Dentist 2.

Plot
Dr. Alan Feinstone is a Los Angeles dentist who, despite his professional success, quietly suffers from extreme obsessive–compulsive disorder and is preoccupied with cleanliness and perfection. On the day of his wedding anniversary, Alan discovers his wife Brooke is cheating on him with the poolman, Matt. After they finish, Alan retrieves his pistol and follows Matt in his car.  He is led to Paula Roberts's house, a friend of Brooke's. Alan invents a story about a surprise party for Brooke and watches Paula invite Matt inside.  Paula's dog attacks Alan, and he shoots it in self-defense.  After returning to his car, he drives to work.

At his dental practice, Alan's first appointment goes poorly when he hallucinates a child has rotten teeth and accidentally stabs him.  As Detective Gibbs investigates the death of Paula's dog, Alan sees his second patient, April Reign, a beauty queen.  Alan hallucinates she is his wife, and, while she is unconscious, takes off her pantyhose and fondles her before choking her.  As she wakes, Alan snaps out of it and hides her pantyhose.  Alan tells her manager, Steve Landers, she is still dizzy from nitrous oxide.  When Steve realizes what really happened, he returns, punches Alan, and threatens a lawsuit.  Alan ends the day early and sends his staff and patients home, including Sarah, a teenager who wants to have her braces removed.

Later that night, Brooke meets Alan at a new opera-themed room at his practice.  After sedating her under the premise of cleaning her teeth, he pulls out her teeth and cuts off her tongue.  Detective Gibbs and his partner Detective Sunshine arrive at Alan's house the next morning to ask him questions.  After the policemen leave, Matt discovers Brooke, who is still alive but sedated.  Alan stabs Matt to death.

Sarah and Paula are waiting for Alan at his practice.  Alan sees Paula first, much to Sarah's disappointment.  When Paula's conversation turns to how good a job Matt does for her, Alan overly-aggressively drills into her tooth, destroying it.  His assistant, Jessica, questions what he is doing, and he snaps out of it.  Alan asks Jessica to finish for him, but after he discovers she has sent Paula home, he fires Jessica.  When she pulls out April's pantyhose and threatens to expose him, Alan kills her.

At the police station, Detective Sunshine discovers that the bullet pulled from Paula's dog's only matches one gun in the area: Alan's. IRS agent Marvin Goldblum, using Alan's tax problems as leverage, extorts a free dental exam and a payout.  Instead, Alan tortures him. Detective Sunshine and Detective Gibbs drive to the Feinstone house to question him further.  Near the pool, they discover Matt's body. They quickly break into the house and find the mutilated Brooke, tied to the bed but still alive. Later, Alan's other dental assistant, Karen, finds Marvin still in the dental chair.  Alan attacks her, then kills her by injecting a needle full of air into her jugular vein.

After Alan removes Sarah's braces, he imagines her teeth rotting.  He pulls his gun, but she escapes and hides in one of the dental rooms, where she finds the blood-soaked Marvin, who attacks Alan.  When Alan recaptures her,  Sarah hysterically promises to brush her teeth three times a day and to never eat candy.  Satisfied, Alan leaves.  The two detectives arrive and rescue Sarah, but are too late to capture Alan.

They follow Alan to a university, where he teaches dentistry classes.  There, Alan maniacally instructs all of his students to pull all of the teeth out of all their patients.  As he hallucinates and shoots a dental student that he mistakes for Matt, the detectives burst into the room, but Alan uses a hostage to escape.  Eventually, he wanders into an auditorium where an opera singer is practicing.  Enchanted, he watches her from behind.  When he reaches out to touch her, she transforms into Brooke, who laughs at him.  Defeated, he falls to his knees and is arrested by the detectives.

Alan, now in a psychiatric hospital, is carted off to his regular dental appointment.  The dentist working on him is revealed to be his toothless wife Brooke, who works violently on his mouth.

Cast

Production

Filming
The Dentist was shot in Los Angeles in a residential home.

Release
The Dentist was released directly to television, premiering on HBO on October 18, 1996.

Critical response
, the internet review aggregator Rotten Tomatoes reports that 0% of 7 critics gave the film a positive review; the average rating is 2.9/10.  Allmovie called it a subpar horror-comedy about dental anxiety that "adds nothing new to the mix besides over-the-top images of mouths being desecrated and queasy allusions to the alleged filthiness of oral sex".  Alan Jones of the Radio Times called the film "both grisly and hilariously funny".  TV Guide rated it 2 out of 4 stars and wrote, "In its state of Grand Guignol-overkill, this offbeat chiller is bound to offend those viewers who wish the offspring of Sam Raimi and Stuart Gordon would learn the use of filmmaking restraint."

Accolades
Anthony C. Ferrante won "Best Special Effects" at the 1996 Fantafestival for his work on The Dentist. The film also won the "Jury Grand Prize" at the 1996 Sweden Fantastic Film Festival. It was nominated but did not win "Best Film" at the 1996 Fantasporto.

Home media
Vidmark Entertainment released The Dentist on VHS on December 31, 1996. It was later released on DVD by Lionsgate on October 21, 1998. In January 2023, Vestron Video released the film for the first time on Blu-ray as part of their Vestron Video Collector's Series, in a two-disc set alongside the film's sequel.

References

External links
 
 

1996 films
1996 crime thriller films
1996 horror films
1990s American films
1990s English-language films
1990s horror thriller films
1990s serial killer films
1990s slasher films
American crime thriller films
American horror thriller films
American serial killer films
American slasher films
Crime horror films
Films about dentistry
Films about medical malpractice
Films about obsessive–compulsive disorder
Films directed by Brian Yuzna
Films scored by Alan Howarth (composer)
Trimark Pictures films